Wecoma may refer to:

 RV Wecoma, a seagoing research marine vessel based in Newport, Oregon operated by NOAA and OSU
 Wecoma, Oregon, a community of the Oregon Coast which was merged into Oceanlake, Oregon in 1945—which in 1965—merged with four other cities to form Lincoln City
 Wecoma Beach, the current beach adjacent to the former community